Morgan Grace is a songwriter from Portland, Oregon. Mostly a solo acoustic performer, she released her first album, The Rules of Dating in 2003 on Lady Lush Records. In 2004, she joined up with former Wipers and Napalm Beach drummer Sam Henry. The two recorded and co-produced the multi-genre spanning album The Sound of Something Breaking in 2005.

She gained greater notoriety in August 2006 when her song "The Rules of Dating" won first prize in a songwriting contest at American Idol Underground, an online version of American Idol which caters to independent bands and songwriters and offers no promise of major label affiliation like the TV version does.

External links
Official homepage
Morgan's MySpace

Year of birth missing (living people)
Living people